The Buffalo Bills are a professional American football team based in Buffalo, New York.

Buffalo Bills may also refer to:
 Buffalo Bills (AAFC), a former American football team, also based in Buffalo, New York, that played in the All-America Football Conference from 1946 to 1949
 Buffalo Bills (quartet), a barbershop quartet formed in Buffalo, New York

See also
 Buffalo Bill (disambiguation)
 Buffalo Bulls, the athletic teams representing the University at Buffalo in intercollegiate athletics